On June 30, 2022, a ten-year-old girl from Columbus, Ohio, United States, traveled to Indiana to get an abortion because abortion law in Ohio did not provide an exception for minor children who became pregnant because of rape. Her case drew national attention and commentary from public figures, due in part to its proximity to the June 24, 2022, decision of the Supreme Court of the United States in Dobbs v. Jackson Women's Health Organization, which overturned Roe v. Wade and allowed states, including Ohio, to impose substantial limitations on abortion.

The girl had become pregnant in May 2022 when she was still nine years old. Her case was reported to the Columbus Division of Police on June 22, 2022. During the ensuing law enforcement investigation, a 27-year-old man was arrested and charged with two felony counts of rape. He appeared in court on July 13 and pleaded not guilty to the charges. His trial is scheduled to begin on March 7, 2023. During the same period, the office of the Indiana Attorney General investigated the Indiana physician who performed the procedure, and referred the matter to Indiana's medical licensing board, which is set to hear the case on February 23, 2023.

Criminal proceedings

On June 22, 2022, the Children's Services department of Franklin County, Ohio, notified the Columbus Division of Police about a 10-year-old girl who was pregnant. She traveled to Indianapolis, Indiana, to undergo an abortion procedure on June 30.

On July 12, 2022, a criminal complaint was filed with the Franklin County Municipal Court which alleged that the child was raped in mid-May 2022 (when the girl was nine years old) and that she identified a suspect to law enforcement in early July. According to the complaint, the suspect allegedly confessed when detectives brought him to police headquarters for a saliva test. The suspect appeared in the Franklin County municipal court for arraignment on July 13 and pleaded not guilty to the charges. His trial is scheduled to begin on March 7, 2023.

Political reactions
On July 1, 2022, The Indianapolis Star reported that a ten-year-old girl who had been raped traveled from Ohio to Indiana to have an abortion. President Joe Biden highlighted the case in remarks at the White House on July 8, 2022, stating: "She was forced to have to travel out of the state to Indiana to seek to terminate the pregnancy and maybe save her life. Ten years old—10 years old!—raped, six weeks pregnant, already traumatized, was forced to travel to another state".

Some right-leaning politicians and media sources initially called the story a hoax; Dave Yost, the Ohio Attorney General, doubted early reports of the incident, saying, "Every day that goes by, the more likely that this is a fabrication." After news of the arrest of the alleged rapist validated the Star story, these sources did not apologize for claiming the story was a hoax. Ohio Congressman Jim Jordan cited Yost in tweet, stating that the claim was "another lie", and then later deleted the tweet. James Bopp, the general counsel for the National Right to Life Committee, said in an interview that the girl should have carried her child to term, and that "She would have had the baby, and as many women who have had babies as a result of rape, we would hope that she would understand the reason and ultimately the benefit of having the child". Bopp's comment led to ire from several left-leaning politicians and media sources, deriding Dobbs and the stance taken by the right. Governor of South Dakota Kristi Noem also commented on the case, saying that "I don't believe a tragic situation should be perpetuated by another tragedy."

Yost, despite his initial doubts about the case, applauded the arrest of the alleged rapist. Yost also asserted at that time that Ohio law on the matter had been misconstrued, and that the girl could have received an abortion in the state if a treating physician deemed it a medical emergency, even if it was not life-threatening. Yost revisited his comments on the case in December 2022, following his reelection, stating his regrets that "what I said was not what people heard, and what people heard created a lot of pain", and describing himself as having "nothing in my heart but compassion and grief for what that little girl went through".

Indiana investigation
The New York Times, noting the controversy sparked by the case, reported on the increased probability of medical complications due to pregnancy at a young age, stating that "prominent abortion opponents suggested the child should have carried her pregnancy to term", but that "midwives and doctors who work in countries where pregnancy is common in young adolescent girls say those pushing for very young girls to carry pregnancies to term may not understand the brutal toll of pregnancy and delivery on the body of a child". The Indiana physician who performed the procedure, Caitlin Bernard, reported it as required by state law. Todd Rokita, the Indiana Attorney General, then announced an investigation into Bernard, stating that the doctor "used a 10-year-old girl—a child rape victim's personal trauma—to push her political ideology", and further asserting that she was "aided and abetted by a fake news media who conveniently misquoted my words to try to give abortionists and their readership numbers an extra boost". In an August 17 opinion piece published in The Wall Street Journal, Rokita characterized an investigation into the doctor as aimed at protecting patient privacy.

Indiana University Health, where Bernard had admitting privileges, reported conducting an internal investigation, and finding the doctor to be in compliance with privacy laws. The doctor also reported receiving harassment due to having performed the procedure. NPR reported that following this incident, a substantial percentage of OB-GYN medical residents in Indiana were contemplating leaving the state due to Indiana having a general ban on performing abortions and due to the way Bernard's actions were being scrutinized.

In November 2022, Bernard sued Rokita for launching a frivolous investigation. On November 30, Rokita requested that the Indiana state medical licensing board take disciplinary measures against Bernard. Rokita said that Bernard failed to tell authorities that the 10-year-old girl was abused, and also spoke to the news media about the treatment she provided, which Rokita said violates medical privacy laws. Bernard dropped her suit the following month, following a ruling by the court denying Bernard's effort to prohibit Rokita from using complaints filed by persons unrelated to the case. However, the court also ruled that Rokita had improperly publicly discussed the case before complaints were filed. Indiana's medical licensing board is set to hear the case against Bernard on February 23, 2023.

See also
Abortion in Indiana
Abortion in Ohio
2009 Brazilian girl abortion case
C Case

Notes

References

2022 in the United States
United States abortion law
Rapes in the United States